The 2015 Wellington Sevens is the 16th edition of the tournament as part of the 2014–15 Sevens World Series. It is hosted in Wellington, New Zealand, at the Westpac Stadium.

Format
The teams are divided into pools of four teams, who play a round-robin within the pool. Points are awarded in each pool on a different schedule from most rugby tournaments—3 for a win, 2 for a draw, 1 for a loss.
The top two teams in each pool advance to the Cup competition. The four quarterfinal losers drop into the bracket for the Plate. The Bowl is contested by the third- and fourth-place finishers in each pool, with the losers in the Bowl quarterfinals dropping into the bracket for the Shield.

Teams
The participating teams are:

Match officials
The match officials for the 2015 Wellington Sevens are as follows:

  Mike Adamson (Scotland)
  Federico Anselmi (Argentina)
  Nick Briant (New Zealand)
  Ben Crouse (South Africa)
  Richard Kelly (New Zealand)
  Anthony Moyes (Australia)
  Matt O'Brien (Australia)
  Marius van der Westhuizen (South Africa)

Pool Stage

Pool A

Pool B

Pool C

Pool D

Knockout stage
[Cup/Plate] 
The top two teams in each pool advance to the Cup/Plate competition.

The four Cup/Plate quarterfinal winners contest the Cup.

The four Cup/Plate quarterfinal losers drop into the bracket for the Plate.

[Bowl/Shield] 
The bottom two teams in each pool move on to the Bowl/Shield competition.

The four Bowl/Shield quarterfinal winners contest the Bowl.

The four Bowl/Shield quarterfinal losers drop into the bracket for the Shield.

Shield
The Bowl/Shield Quarter-finals losers (shown in italics below) play in the Semi-finals of the Shield.
The winners play in the Bowl.

Bowl
The Bowl/Shield Quarter-finals winners (shown in bold) contest the Bowl.

Plate
The Cup/Plate Quarter-finals losers (shown in italics) play in the Semi-finals of the Plate.

Cup
The Cup/Plate Quarter-finals winners (shown in bold) contest the Cup.

References

Wellington Sevens
Wellington Sevenst
2015